Battersea Park Road railway station in Battersea, South London was opened by the London, Chatham and Dover Railway in 1867. It closed in 1916 along with other inner-London stations on Main Line. Battersea Park railway station, nearby on a different line from London Victoria, remains open. There is no evidence of the station at rail level, but the bricked-up entrance can be seen under the rail bridge close to Battersea Dogs and Cats Home.

References

Railway stations in Great Britain opened in 1867
Railway stations in Great Britain closed in 1916
Former London, Chatham and Dover Railway stations
Disused railway stations in the London Borough of Wandsworth
Buildings and structures in Battersea